Grey County is a county of the Canadian province of Ontario. The county seat is in Owen Sound. It is located in the subregion of Southern Ontario named Southwestern Ontario.  Grey County is also a part of the Georgian Triangle. At the time of the Canada 2016 Census the population of the county was 93,830.

Administrative divisions
Grey County consists of the following municipalities (in order of population):

History

Origin and evolution
The first European settlement was in the vicinity of Collingwood or Meaford. Exploring parties arrived from York in 1825 by travelling from Holland Landing and down the Holland River into Lake Simcoe and Shanty Bay. From there they travelled by land to the Nottawasaga River into Georgian Bay and along the thickly wooded shore.

In 1837 the village of Sydenham was surveyed by Charles Rankin. In 1856 it was incorporated as the Town of Owen Sound with an estimated population of 2,000.

In 1840, the area became part of the new District of Wellington, and its territory formed the County of Waterloo for electoral purposes. In 1849, Wellington District was abolished, and Waterloo County remained for municipal and judicial purposes. The territory of the Bruce Peninsula became part of Waterloo in 1849, but was later withdrawn and transferred to Bruce County in 1851.

In January 1852, Waterloo County became the United Counties of Wellington, Waterloo and Grey. Grey County was named in honour of the British Colonial Secretary's father, Charles Grey, 2nd Earl Grey, who was Prime Minister of the United Kingdom from 1830-1834. Its territory was declared to consist of the following townships, together with part of the Indian Reserve on the Bruce Peninsula:

 Artemesia
 Bentinck
 Collingwood
 Derby
 Egremont
 Euphrasia
 Glenelg
 Holland
 Melancthon
 Normanby
 Osprey
 Proton
 Saint Vincent
 Sullivan
 Sydenham

The Indian lands were later surveyed and became the townships of Keppel and Sarawak. A Provisional Municipal Council was organized for the County in April 1852, with the Town of Sydenham named as the county town.

Waterloo was withdrawn from the United Counties in January 1853, and the remainder was renamed the United Counties of Wellington and Grey. In January 1854, the United Counties was dissolved, and Wellington and Grey were separate counties for all purposes.

In 1861-1862 the first gravel roads were constructed into Owen Sound at a cost of $300,000. The four colonization roads were:

 the Garafraxa Road running from Fergus to Owen Sound (now Highway 6);
 the Durham Road leading east and west from the village of Durham (formerly part of Highway 4, and now County Road 4);
 the Lake Shore Road from Collingwood to Owen Sound (now Highway 26); and
 the Toronto-Sydenham Road leading from Shelburne to Owen Sound (now Highway 10).

Prior to the road building it often took two days to walk up to Owen Sound.

In 1881, the township of Melancthon and the village of Shelburne were withdrawn from Grey and transferred to the new Dufferin County.

On January 1, 2001, Grey County underwent a major restructuring, resulting in the reduction in number of the local municipalities:

Demographics

See also
 List of municipalities in Ontario
 Census divisions of Ontario
 List of townships in Ontario
 Saugeen Kame Terraces
 List of secondary schools in Grey County, Ontario

References

External links

 
1852 establishments in Canada
Counties in Ontario
Southwestern Ontario